Rudolf Pächter (also Rudolf Pehtla; 27 August 1883 – ?) was an Estonian politician. He was a member of II Riigikogu. He was a member of the Riigikogu since 17 May 1924. He replaced Eduard Tiiman. On 26 May 1924, he resigned his position and he was replaced by Andres Nõmme.

References

1883 births
Year of death missing
Workers' United Front politicians
Members of the Riigikogu, 1923–1926